Yawarqucha (Quechua yawar blood, qucha lake, "blood lake",  Hispanicized spelling Yahuarcocha) is a  mountain in the Andes of Peru. It is situated in the Huancavelica Region, Huaytará Province,  Pilpichaca District. Yawarqucha lies north of Wakan Q'allay.

References

Mountains of Peru
Mountains of Huancavelica Region